The 2013 Israeli Basketball League Cup is the 8th edition of the Israeli Basketball League Cup pre-season tournament. It plays between October 6 and October 10 at Bet Maccabi in Rishon LeZion and NOKIA Arena in Tel Aviv.

Participants
As the format states, the top eight teams on the 2012–13 Israeli Super League qualified for the tournament. However, league champions Maccabi Haifa were at the time in the United States competing against clubs of the National Basketball Association (NBA) and were therefore replaced by ninth placed team Hapoel Holon.

Tournament Bracket

2012
League Cup